John Brown (April 4, 1904 – May 16, 1957) was a British actor.

Early years
Brown was born in Hull, Yorkshire, England.

Radio
Brown had major roles in several popular radio shows: He was "John Doe" in the Texaco Star Theater's version of Fred Allen's Allen's Alley, played Irma's love interest Al in My Friend Irma, both "Gillis" and Digby "Digger" O'Dell in The Life of Riley, (a role he reprised for the first incarnation of the television show), "Broadway" in The Damon Runyon Theatre, and "Thorny" the neighbor on the radio version of The Adventures of Ozzie and Harriet. Perhaps his most memorable piece of work is the ‘Broadway’ role; once heard, many find it impossible to think of the narrator of Damon Runyon’s stories as anyone else. It was a measure of Brown’s talent that this quintessentially American character was portrayed by an Englishman.

Film
Brown appeared in some notable films: as the inebriated professor in Hitchcock’s Strangers on a Train (1951), The Day the Earth Stood Still (1951, uncredited), and The Wild One (1953); he supplied the voice of "Ro-Man" in the 1953 cult science fiction B-film Robot Monster.

Television
In early television, Brown was the second actor (after Hal March) to play "Harry Morton", the next-door neighbor of George Burns and Gracie Allen in their situation comedy show, opposite Bea Benaderet; his tenure on the series lasted six months, and he was replaced by Fred Clark in June 1951.

Personal life
In 1952, Brown was placed on the Hollywood blacklist.

Death
Brown died of a heart attack on May 16, 1957, in West Hollywood, California, while en route to his doctor's office.

Filmography

Radio

Films

Television

References

External links
 
 
 The Damon Runyon Theatre – audio files of the complete series, freely available at the Internet Archive

1904 births
1957 deaths
Burials at Eden Memorial Park Cemetery
English male radio actors
English male television actors
English male voice actors
Hollywood blacklist
Jewish English male actors
20th-century English male actors